"The Golden Rocket" is a 1950 single by Hank Snow.  "The Golden Rocket" was his follow-up release to "I'm Movin' On", and spent two weeks on the Country & Western Best Seller list and a total of twenty-three weeks on the chart.

References

Hank Snow songs
1950 singles
1950 songs
Song articles with missing songwriters